H. polymorpha may refer to:

 Hansenula polymorpha, a methylotrophic yeast
 Hedypnois polymorpha, a dandelion native to areas from Canary Islands to Iran
 Heterolocha polymorpha, a geometer moth
 Heteropurpura polymorpha, a sea snail
 Hydra polymorpha, an athecate hydroid
 Hydrostachys polymorpha, an aquatic plant
 Hymenachne polymorpha, a true grass
 Hyphomonas polymorpha, a psychrophilic bacterium
 Hypoestes polymorpha, a Paleotropical plant